Ontika Landscape Conservation Area is a nature park which is located in Ida-Viru County, Estonia.

The protected area was founded in 1939 to protect the coast and forest of Sakka-Ontika. In 1957, the Saka-Ontika-Toila Klint Prohibited Area was established.

References

Nature reserves in Estonia
Geography of Ida-Viru County